Marrow may refer to:

 Marrow (vegetable), the mature fruit of certain Cucurbita pepo cultivars
 Bone marrow, a semi-solid tissue in bones
 Bone marrow (food)

Arts and entertainment

Music
 Marrow (band), American rock band
 Marrow (album), by Madder Mortem, 2018, and its title track
 Marrow 1, an EP by I:Scintilla, 2012
 Marrow 2, 2013
 "Marrow", a song by Ani DiFranco from the 2001 album Revelling/Reckoning
 "Marrow", a song by Anohni from the 2016 album Hopelessness
 "Marrow", a song by Meshuggah from the 2012 album Koloss
 "Marrow", a song by Yob from the 2014 album Clearing the Path to Ascend
 "Marrow", a song by St. Vincent from the 2009 album Actor

Other uses in arts and entertainment
 Marrow (comics), a character in the X-Men comic series
 Marrow (novel), by Robert Reed, 2000

People
 Alex Marrow (born 1990), English footballer
 Alfred J. Marrow (1905–1978), American industrial psychologist and philanthropist
 Buck Marrow (1909–1982), American baseball player
 Christopher Marrow (born 1996), South African cricketer
 Claude Marrow (born 1978), American wrestler, ring name Ruckus 
 Deborah Marrow (1948–2019), American arts administrator
 Henry Marrow Jr. (1947–1970), victim of the Shooting of Henry Marrow
 Jermaine Marrow (born 1997), American basketball player 
 Mitch Marrow (born 1975), American football player
 Queen Esther Marrow (born 1941), American soul and gospel singer
 Vince Marrow (born 1968), American football player
 Ice-T (Tracy Marrow, born 1958), American rapper and actor

Other uses
 Fort Marrow, a historic American Civil War fort in West Virginia, U.S.
 Marrow, the student branch of the Anthony Nolan charity

See also

 Marrowbone (disambiguation)
 Joseph R. Marro (1907–1989), American lawyer and politician
 Marrow Controversy, a Scottish ecclesiastical dispute occasioned by the republication of The Marrow of Modern Divinity in 1718